The 1984 All-Ireland Senior Football Championship was the 98th staging of the All-Ireland Senior Football Championship, the Gaelic Athletic Association's premier inter-county Gaelic football tournament. The championship began on 13 May 1984 and ended on 23 September 1984.

Dublin entered the championship as the defending champions.

On 23 September 1984, Kerry won the championship following a 0–14 to 1–6 defeat of Dublin in the All-Ireland final. This was their 28th All-Ireland title.

Dublin's Barney Rock was the championship's top scorer with 5-24. Kerry's Jack O'Shea was the choice for Texaco Footballer of the Year.

Centenary year

1984 was a special year in the annals of Gaelic games as it was the centenary of the foundation of the Gaelic Athletic Association.  Because of this a series of events celebrating the occasion were planned to take place throughout the year. The festivities were officially launched on 18 March at the Michael Cusack cottage in Carron, County Clare.  Ash trees were planted to mark the occasion and a plaque was also unveiled in memory of the founder of the association. The Railway Cup finals were later played in Cusack Park, Ennis.

A £100,000 film was also commissioned by the centenary committee.  Made by Louis Marcus the film was designed to be a portrait rather than a chronological history of the GAA.

Results

Connacht Senior Football Championship

Quarter-finals

Semi-finals

Final

Leinster Senior Football Championship

Preliminary round

Quarter-finals

Semi-finals

Final

Munster Senior Football Championship

Quarter-finals

Semi-finals

Final

Ulster Senior Football Championship

Preliminary round

Quarter-finals

Semi-finals

Final

All-Ireland Senior Football Championship

Semi-finals

Final

Championship statistics

Miscellaneous

 For the first time in years there were 2 draws and replays in the Munster football championship Quarter-finals.
 Tyrone are Ulster champions for the first time since 1973.
 The All Ireland semi-final between Dublin vs Tyrone was their first championship meeting.

Scoring

Overall

Top scorers in a single game

References